The AVN (Adult Video News) Hall of Fame has honored people for their work in the adult entertainment industry since 1995. The individuals inducted into the AVN Hall of Fame have "made significant contributions to the adult industry" and have had "a minimum of 10 years in the industry" to be considered for induction.

There are several branches of the AVN Hall of Fame:
Performers and directors enter the original AVN, video-based Hall of Fame.
The Founders branch is "for those who founded the industry’s pioneering companies".
The Internet Founders branch is "for those who built the online sector" of the industry.
The Pleasure Products branch is "for manufacturers, distributors, and retailers of sex toys".
The Executive branch is "for key members of the industry who work behind the scenes in the corporate offices or excelled in other capacities—for example, in sales, marketing, or education".

Members
Names and years of induction of members.

AVN Hall of Fame – Executive Branch

AVN Hall of Fame – Founders Branch

AVN Hall of Fame – Pleasure Products Branch

AVN Hall of Fame – Internet Founders Branch

References

External links
 avnawards.com (official listing - archived April 15, 2009)
 AVN.com (official site)
 Adult Video News Awards at the IMDb
 
 
 1999 Inductees
 2001 Inductees
 2002 Inductees
 2010 nominations (archived at Wayback Machine, August 29, 2011)
 2011 nominations (archived at Wayback Machine, July 19, 2011)
 2012 nominations (archived at Wayback Machine, February 4, 2012) or AVN Awards 2012: The Nominees - click near "downloaded as a pdf file by clicking here."
 
 
 "AVN Announces the Winners of the 2014 AVN Awards"
 "Class of 2017: The AVN Hall of Fame's Newest Inductees"

AVN Awards
Entertainment halls of fame
Lists of hall of fame inductees
Lists of pornographic film actors
Adult video